Milionari de weekend (Weekend Millionaires) is a 2004 Romanian comedy film directed by Cătălin Saizescu.

Cast
 Tudor Chirilă - Godzi 
 Maria Dinulescu - Miki 
 Andi Vasluianu - computerist Zetu
 Mihai Bendeac - barman Alex 
 George Alexandru - Merțanu
 Nicodim Ungureanu - Chioru
 Bogdan Dumitrescu - Paulică

Awards

Milionari de weekend won the UARF Award for best debut feature film (2005).

References

External links 

2004 comedy films
2004 films
Romanian comedy films
2000s Romanian-language films